Mozammel Haque is a National Awami Party (Muzaffar) politician and a former Jatiya Sangsad member representing the Brahmanbaria-1 constituency.

Career
Haque was elected to parliament from Brahmanbaria-1 as a National Awami Party (Muzaffar) candidate in 1986 and 1988.

References

Living people
National Awami Party (Muzaffar) politicians
3rd Jatiya Sangsad members
4th Jatiya Sangsad members
Year of birth missing (living people)
Place of birth missing (living people)